Steve Shields is the name of:
Steve Shields (ice hockey) (born 1972), National Hockey League goaltender
Steve Shields (baseball) (born 1958), retired American baseball player
Steve Shields (basketball) (born 1965), head men's basketball coach at the University of Arkansas at Little Rock